Sebastiania integra is a species of flowering plant in the family Euphorbiaceae. It was originally described as Gymnanthes integra Fawc. & Rendle in 1920. It is native to Jamaica.

References

Plants described in 1920
Flora of Jamaica
integra
Flora without expected TNC conservation status